Kabiraj Negi Lama (कविराज नेगी लामा) (born 20 September 1989 in Dandakharka, Makwanpur) is a former Nepalese taekwondo athlete, National Para Taekwondo Team Coach and 2020 Summer Paralympics Coach,  who participated in different taekwondo competitions. He is the grandson of former minister Tilak Bahadur Negi Lama.

Career as an athlete
He won the Gold Medal in 9th Jeju International Sports for All Taekwondo Championships, Poomsae category in 2009 in South Korea.

Coaching career
He is the 5th Dan Black belt from Kukkiwon South Korea & Nepal Taekwondo Association (NTA) since 2017. He is International Para Taekwondo Coach to acquire International Coach Certificate, Para Taekwondo Level-II License, conducted by World Para Taekwondo in December 2020. He is the Team Coach of National Para Taekwondo Team, Nepal Taekwondo Association since 2015.

2016
He was the Team Coach in the 20th Asian Cities Taekwondo Championship held in Hong Kong, China in 2016. Later the same year, he participated in Para Taekwondo Course in 2016 in Muju, South Korea.

2017
He was the Team Coach participating at the 3rd Asian Para Taekwondo Championships in 2017 in Choenchoun, South Korea where the para athlete Ranjana Dhami won the Bronze Medal in Kyorugi (K-44) category.

2018
His team participated in Gold Coast Open Taekwondo Championship held in Australia in 2018, where he represented the team as the Team Manager.

2019
He participated as the team coach at 8th World Para Taekwondo Championships, where athlete Bikram Shrestha won the Bronze Medal, in 2019 in Antalya, Turkey. Later he participated in Para Taekwondo Training Camp in 2019 organized in Miki City, Japan.

2021
His athlete Palesha Goverdhan won gold medal, Shrijana Ghising and Bishal Garbuja won silver and a bronze each respectively at 2021 Asian Youth Para Games. He leaded the para team as the coach to achieve the historical medals in 2021 Asian Youth Para Games.

He participated as the team coach Nepal at the 2020 Summer Paralympics Gemes. His athlete Palesha Goverdhan won Repechage match against United States and Serbia athletes in the Tokyo 2020 Summer Paralympics Games.

2022
Lama participated in the Para 4th WT President's Cup Asian Region Taekwondo Championships in March 14, 2022 Tehran, Iran as a coach and his player Shrijana Ghising won a silver medal for Nepal.

He has participated in the Sharjah Qualification Tournament for Hangzhou 2022 Asian Para Games, Sharjah UAE on May 24–27, 2022 promoted by the world taekwondo as a coach and his athlete Ranjana Dhami won a Bronze Medal for Nepal.

When Negi Lama was the Team Coach of the Riyadh 2022 World Para Taekwondo Grand Prix Final held in Riyadh Saudi Arabia on 8 to 10 December 2022, his athlete Shrijana Ghising succeeded in winning the first historical gold medal for Nepal in the World Taekwondo Grand Prix Final after defeating the top three athletes in the world ranking, players  from Mexico, Brazil and Turkey.

References 

Nepalese male taekwondo practitioners
Living people
People from Makwanpur District
1989 births
Tamang people